Tütünköy is a village in the Kurtalan District of Siirt Province in Turkey. The village had a population of 346 in 2021.

The hamlets of Aydıncık, Çay, Çukurlu, Kullaçentik, Tepecik and Yapılar are attached to the village.

Notable people 

 Rojda Aykoç

References 

Kurdish settlements in Siirt Province
Villages in Kurtalan District